

Stephan Rittau (27 December 1891 – 22 August 1942) was a general in the Wehrmacht of Nazi Germany during World War II. He was a recipient of the Knight's Cross of the Iron Cross. Rittau was killed on 22 August 1942 in Rzhev, Soviet Union.

Awards and decorations

 Knight's Cross of the Iron Cross on 2 November 1941 as Generalmajor and commander of 129. Infanterie-Division

References

Citations

Bibliography

 

1891 births
1942 deaths
Lieutenant generals of the German Army (Wehrmacht)
People from Wągrowiec
People from the Province of Posen
German Army personnel of World War I
Recipients of the clasp to the Iron Cross, 1st class
Recipients of the Knight's Cross of the Iron Cross
German Army personnel killed in World War II
German Army generals of World War II